Coleophora cisoriella is a moth of the family Coleophoridae. It was first described from Minas Gerais in southeastern Brazil. It is closely related to Coleophora xyridella.

References

cisoriella